moralist or moralism may refer to

 Moralism, a philosophy that arose in the 19th century
 French Moralists, those who belong to a tradition in French literature that is concerned with the description of the moral character of humanity
 The Moralist, 1959 Italian comedy directed by Giorgio Bianchi
 Scientific moralist, those who try to ground morality in rational, empirical consideration of the natural world
 Several outdated or derogatory meanings related to morality; see the wiktionary definitions for moralist and moralism.

See also
 John Gregory (moralist) (1724–1773), Scottish physician, medical writer and moralist
 The Gay Moralist, the sobriquet for John Frank Corvino (born 1969), an American philosopher